This is a list of mayors of the city of Eugene, Oregon. The years following each name denote each mayor's term in office.

J. B. Underwood (1864–1869) (official office name at the time: President of the Board of Trustees)
A. S. Patterson (1869–1873)
Joel Ware (1873–1875)
Benjamin Franklin Dorris (1875–1877)
George B. Dorris (1877–1879)
Benjamin Franklin Dorris (1879–1881)
Thomas Grundy Hendricks (1881–1883)
G. B. Dunn (1883–1885)
Francis Berrian Dunn (1885–1889) 
Albert Gallitin Hovey (1889–1891)
John Henry McClung (1891–1893) 
Sam H. Friendly (1893–1895)
Joseph DeWitt Matlock (1895–1897)
William F. Kuykendall (1897–1899)
Tom W. Harris (1899–1901)
Gabriel Russell Chrisman (1901–1905)
Francis Marion Wilkins (1905–1907)
Joseph DeWitt Matlock (1907–1910)
Frank J. Berger (1910–1913)
Darwin E. Yoran (1913–1915)
W. A. Bell (1915–1917)
Charles O. Peterson (1917–1923)
Edwin B. Parks (1923–1925)
Ernest U. Lee (1925–1927)
Alex L. Williamson (1927–1929)
Howard E. Wilder (1929–1932)
Elisha Large (1932–1945)
Earl L. McNutt (1945–1949)
Victor Edwin Johnson (1949–1956)
John Joseph McGinty (1957–1958)
Edwin Earl Cone (1958–1968)
Les Anderson (1969–1977)
Gus Keller (1977–1984)
Brian Obie (1985–1988)
Jeffrey Miller (1989–1992)
Ruth Bascom (1993–1996)
Jim Torrey (1997–2004)
Kitty Piercy (2005–2017)
Lucy Vinis (2017–present)

See also
 List of mayors of places in Oregon
 Lists of Oregon-related topics

References

Eugene